Sunday Emmanuel (8 October 1978 – 15 January 2004 in Kaduna) was a Nigerian athlete who specialised in sprinting events. He represented his country in the 100 metres at the 2000 Summer Olympics reaching the semi-finals.

He was the runner-up in both the 100 m and 200 metres at the 1995 African Junior Athletics Championships, then won both events at the 1997 edition. His foremost individual medals were a 100 m bronze medal at the 1996 African Championships in Athletics and a silver in the 200 m at the 1998 African Championships in Athletics.

His personal bests are 10.06 for the 100 m, 20.45 for the 200 m and 6.52 for the 60 metres.

He died after an auto-accident in Kaduna, Nigeria.

Competition record

Personal bests
Outdoor
100 metres – 10.06 (Enugu 1997)
200 metres – 20.45 (-0.9 m/s) (Dakar 1998)
Indoor
60 metres – 6.52 (Chemnitz 2000)
200 metres – 21.20 (Piraeus 1999)

References

1978 births
2004 deaths
Sportspeople from Kaduna
Nigerian male sprinters
Olympic athletes of Nigeria
Athletes (track and field) at the 2000 Summer Olympics
Commonwealth Games competitors for Nigeria
Athletes (track and field) at the 2002 Commonwealth Games
Athletes (track and field) at the 1999 All-Africa Games
African Games competitors for Nigeria
Road incident deaths in Nigeria
20th-century Nigerian people
21st-century Nigerian people